Voluntary Service Overseas (VSO) is a not-for-profit international development organization charity with a vision for "a fair world for everyone" and a mission to "create lasting change through volunteering". VSO delivers development impact through a blended volunteer model consisting of international, national, and community volunteers working together to develop the systems and conditions for positive social change.
In 2018–19, VSO worked in 23 countries in Africa and Asia.

VSO currently works in the following core programme areas: 
 Inclusive Education
 Health
 Livelihoods
And through three core approaches that are relevant to all the areas:
 Social Inclusion and Gender
 Social Accountability
 Resilience

In addition, VSO has a youth focus in which young people are both the beneficiaries of social change outcomes as well as the primary actors in creating the change.

Structure and governance
Voluntary Service Overseas (VSO) is a company limited by guarantee. VSO operates internationally largely through branch offices. Exceptions to this are:
 Voluntary Service Overseas (Ireland) Limited Company Limited by Guarantee, which is a subsidiary of VSO and incorporated as a charitable entity in Ireland.
 VSO India, which has agreements in place with the independent Indian charitable organisation, VSO India Trust. These agreements permit the Trust to carry out VSO's work using the VSO trademark.
 Stichting VSO Netherland, which is a Dutch independent charitable organisation that has agreements with VSO, including a trademark license, and whose accounts were integrated with VSO's as of April 2018.
In March 2018, Voluntary Service Overseas USA, Inc. was incorporated, and an application has been made to register this entity as a US 501(c) organisation(iii).

VSO's governing body is the International Board, currently comprising nine trustees. It also has two youth advisors to the Board. The day-to-day management of VSO is carried out by the executive board. The executive board has operational oversight of VSO's global work. Each Executive Board member is responsible for a function of VSO: People, Programmes, Business Development, and Finance.

History
VSO was founded in 1958 by Alec and Mora Dickson through a bishop's letter to the London paper, The Sunday Times, as an educational experience overseas for school-leavers, initially only male, before starting university. Volunteers offered unskilled help in return for basic accommodation and pocket money. In 1962, the practice changed to using university graduate volunteers.

By 1980, the unskilled volunteers had been completely phased out and the length of service had been extended to two years. Active volunteer numbers initially dropped to about 750, but by 2003 had returned to about 1,400. Since December 2004, applications to volunteer have been accepted from those between ages 20 and 75, who also must have at least two years' experience in their field.

In the early 1990s, in order to meet growing demand for highly specialised and skilled volunteers from its partners in developing countries, VSO established partner agencies in Canada, the Netherlands, Kenya/Uganda (VSO Jitolee), and the Philippines (VSO Bahaginan). VSO's structure evolved to become an international federation which now includes Ireland, China and India as well as the above named countries. International volunteers are recruited through all of these bases, and they can be placed in any one of VSO's programmes (e.g. an Irish volunteer working in Nepal, or a Ugandan volunteer working in Tajikistan).

From 2011, VSO led a consortium to deliver the UK government's International Citizen Service programme that provides international volunteer placements for 18- to 25-year-olds. The programme, funded by the Department for International Development (DFID), now includes Raleigh International and Restless Development. In 2016/17, 3,090 young people volunteered through the International Citizen Service programme.

In 2017, VSO was awarded a grant of £50 million from the UK's Department of International Development (DFID) for a program called "Volunteering for Development". The three-year initiative aims to improve quality and access to health and education services as well as livelihood opportunities for the most poor and vulnerable, and targets more than 2 million of the poorest and most marginalised people across the globe. The grant supports VSO's vision to enhance effectiveness across a number of vital areas - including in VSO's "core approaches" of social inclusion and gender, social accountability, and resilience. During its first year the project successfully placed 606 international volunteers and 920 national volunteers across VSO's four areas of focus.

Today
Highlights of VSO today include:
 VSO supports the delivery of integrated, large-scale education, health and livelihoods programmes in a range of countries. Its programmes reached 1.4m people in 2017/18
 VSO now works in post-crisis situations and has recently responded to disasters in Bangladesh, Nepal, the Philippines and Sierra Leone. Most recently it has supported the establishment of a home-based early childhood care and education (ECCE) in emergencies to support refugee Rohingya communities in Bangladesh 
 It supports communities and governments to inform and influence policy dialogues. It recently supported the development of the Africa Union Gender Strategy and the Kenya Special Education Needs Policy.
 In Nepal, VSO has been awarded nearly £10 million for inclusive education work through the UK's Girls' Education Challenge, the world's largest education challenge fund, which targets support for adolescent girls. In its first phase the project Sisters for Sisters' Education introduced to Nepal the first ever peer-based mentoring programme for marginalised girls.
 Citizen Led Monitoring is now a key element of VSOs work. In 2017/18 over 20,000 people in Nepal and Uganda were mobilized for awareness raising and accountability on the delivery of the sustainable development goals
 VSO is supporting the creation of national youth platforms in seven of its countries of operation
 It is playing a leading part in the development of a global standard for responsible and impactful volunteering as part of the Forum for International Volunteering in Development.

Partnerships
VSO works with local partners in the communities they work with, placing volunteers with these partners to help increase their impact and effectiveness. VSO also works with corporate partners, such as Accenture, and Randstad. and Syngenta with whom it is working to build the livelihoods of poor and marginalised farmers in Bangladesh.

See also
 CUSO
 Doctors Without Borders
 EU Aid Volunteers
 European Voluntary Service
 Fredskorpset
 Peace Corps
 United Nations Volunteers

References

Further reading
 "VSO focuses on senior teachers", Education Guardian, January 10, 2006
 "Eight Ways to Change the World", The Guardian, 7 September 2005
 "Women lead as overseas volunteers", Guardian March 20, 2001
 "Brian Deer investigates VSO", London Sunday Times, April 26, 1998
 "Meet the VSO Volunteers" Grasya, July 2011

External links
 VSO homepage
 VSO Ireland homepage
  VSO USA homepage
 VSO Netherlands homepage (in Dutch)

Development charities based in the United Kingdom
International charities
International organisations based in London
International volunteer organizations
Organisations based in the London Borough of Richmond upon Thames
Organizations established in 1958
1958 establishments in the United Kingdom